A referendum on fishing licences was held in Liechtenstein on 3 October 1954. Voters had the choice between the main proposal, a counter-proposal from the Landtag, or against. The main proposal was approved by 61.1% of voters.

Results

References

1954 referendums
1954 in Liechtenstein
Referendums in Liechtenstein
October 1954 events in Europe